The Filipino–American Friendship Highway, officially the Friendship Circumferential Road (or simply the Friendship Highway), is a secondary national road traversing the cities of Angeles City and San Fernando in Pampanga, Philippines.

The entire highway is designated as National Route 216 (N216) of the Philippine highway network.

References

Roads in Pampanga